The King's Romance is a 1914 British silent adventure film directed by Ernest G. Batley and starring Fred Morgan, Ethel Bracewell and Henry Victor.

Cast
 Fred Morgan as The Baron  
 Ethel Bracewell as Vera  
 Henry Victor as Prince Andreas  
 George Foley as Dick  
 Ethyle Batley as The Queen

References

Bibliography
 Goble, Alan. The Complete Index to Literary Sources in Film. Walter de Gruyter, 1999.

External links
 

1914 films
1914 adventure films
British adventure films
British silent feature films
British black-and-white films
1910s English-language films
1910s British films
Silent adventure films